Tom Parrotta (born May 3, 1966) is an American college basketball coach, currently an assistant coach at Hofstra and former head men's basketball coach at Canisius College.

Parrotta played college basketball at Fordham and played professionally in Portugal. He got his coaching start at Nazareth College after his mother spent $600 to send him to the Final Four. Parrotta was an assistant at Niagara from 1995 to 2001. He served as an assistant at Hofstra from 2001 to 2006, when he was hired at Canisius. He was fired from Canisius in 2012, after posting a 5-25 record. In 2012, Parrotta was named an assistant coach at Fordham, later joining the Fairfield staff in 2015 and Columbia in 2020. In 2021, Parrotta returned to Hofstra for his second stint as an assistant coach.

References

1966 births
Living people
American men's basketball coaches
American men's basketball players
American expatriate basketball people in Portugal
Canisius Golden Griffins men's basketball coaches
Fordham Rams men's basketball coaches
Fordham Rams men's basketball players
Hofstra Pride men's basketball coaches
Niagara Purple Eagles men's basketball coaches
Place of birth missing (living people)